The Wichita Indians were a Class A level minor league baseball franchise based in Wichita, Kansas. The Wichita Indians played as members of the Western League from 1950 to 1955. Wichita won the 1955 Western League Championship. The Wichita Indians were an affiliate of the 1950 St. Louis Browns, Cleveland Indians from 1951 to 1952, 1953 St. Louis Browns and Baltimore Orioles in 1954 and 1955.

In 1956, the Indians were succeeded by the Class AAA level Wichita Braves, when the Wichita franchise became a member of the American Association.

History
The Wichita Indians were preceded in the Western League by the Wichita Aviators (1929–1933), Wichita Larks (1927–1928), Wichita Izzies (1923–1926), Wichita Witches (sometimes called the Wichita Wolves) (1917–1922) and Wichita Jobbers (1905–1920). Wichita hosted teams in various other leagues, with professional baseball having started in Wichita with the Wichita Eagles of the Kansas State League in 1898.

The Wichita Indians joined the Western League in 1950 as an affiliate of the St. Louis Browns. The Western League had reformed in 1947 with six teams: Denver Bears, Des Moines Bruins, Lincoln A's, Omaha Cardinals, Pueblo Dodgers and Sioux City Soos. All six clubs remained in 1950, when the league expanded to eight teams, adding the Colorado Springs Sky Sox and Wichita Indians.

The 1950 Indians ended the season with a 77–77 record, placing 4th in the Western League regular season standings, playing under manager Joe Schultz. In the playoffs, Wichita defeated the first–place Omaha Cardinals 3 games to 0 in the semifinals. In the league Finals, Wichita lost 3 games to 1 to the Sioux City Soos. The Indians drew 126,729 fans, ranking 5th in the league.

In 1951, Wichita became an affiliate of the Cleveland Indians and finished 84–68, placing 3rd in the standings. In the Western League playoffs, Wichita was defeated by the Denver Bears 3 games to 1 as Joe Schultz returned as manager.

The 1952 Indians finished in a tie for 6th place with the Lincoln A's in the eight–team Western League with an 67–87 record. Wichita finished 22.0 games behind the Denver Bears in the final regular season standings and did not quality for the playoffs. Ralph Winegarner was the manager.

Becoming a St. Louis Browns affiliate, the Wichita Indians finished in last place in 1953, playing under managers George Hausmann, George Kovach and Mark Christman. The ended the season with a record of 58–96 and finished 37.0 games behind the Colorado Springs Sky Sox in the eight–team Western League standings. Wichita had attendance of 68,683 fans, 7th best in the Western League.

In 1954, the Indians became affiliates of the Baltimore Orioles after the St. Louis Browns relocated. The team ended the season with a 76–77 record, and in 6th place in the regular season standings. playing under managers Herb Brett and Les Layton, Wichita did not qualify for the Western League playoffs, finishing 19.0 games behind the 1st place Denver Bears. The 1954 home season attendance was 87,854, 4th in the league.>

Wichita won the 1955 Western League Championship. In the regular season, the 1955 Indians finished in a tie for 3rd place at 78–73 and began a Western League Championship run, playing under manager Bud Bates. First, the Indians defeated the Des Moines Bruins in a 3rd place tie–breaker game. In the playoffs, the Indians beat the Pueblo Dodgers 3 games to 1 in the semifinals. Advancing to the Finals, Wichita beat the Des Moines Bruins three games to one to claim the 1955 Western League Championship. Bob Harrison pitched a no–hitter for Wichita in the Finals.

After their 1955 Western League Championship, Wichita had a team in new league in 1956. The American Association member Toledo Sox relocated to Wichita and the Wichita Braves became the Triple-A affiliate of the Milwaukee Braves in 1956. The Western League folded after the 1958 season.

The ballparks
The Wichita Indians were noted to have played at historic Lawrence-Dumont Stadium. The ballpark was built in 1934 and was demolished in 2019. Lawrence-Dumont Stadium was replaced on the site by Riverfront Stadium in 2020.

The Indians were referenced to have played some games at Central Park Stadium in El Dorado, Kansas during the July and August months. Today, the stadium is called McDonald Stadium.

Timeline

Year–by–year record

Notable alumni

Bobby Balcena (1950)
Bud Bates (1955, MGR)
Jack Bruner (1952)
Mike Blyzka (1950)
Mark Christman (1953, MGR)
Perry Currin (1950)
George Elder (1950)
Johnny Goryl (1955)
Lenny Green (1955)
Bob Harrison (1955)
George Hausmann (1953)
Mel Held (1950, 1953)
Hal Hudson (1955)
Julián Ladera (1953)
Don Larsen (1950) 1956 World Series Most Valuable Player
Garland Lawing (1954)
Les Layton (1954)
Chuck Locke (1953)
Harry MacPherson (1951)
Don Minnick (1951)
Don Mossi (1951) MLB All-Star
Jim Pisoni (1953)
Carl Powis (1950)
Joe Schultz (1950-1951, MGR)
Jim Snyder (1955)
Bob Turley (1950) 3x MLB All-Star; 1958 AL Cy Young Award; 1958 World Series M.V.P.
Lefty Wallace (1952)
Tommy Warren (1954-1955)

See also
Wichita Indians players

References

External Reference
Baseball Reference

Baseball teams established in 1950
Sports clubs disestablished in 1955
1950 establishments in Kansas
St. Louis Browns minor league affiliates
Cleveland Guardians minor league affiliates
Wichita, Kansas
Baltimore Orioles minor league affiliates
Defunct minor league baseball teams
Defunct sports teams in Kansas
Baseball teams disestablished in 1955
Defunct Western League teams
Sedgwick County, Kansas